Ivaylo Cove (‘Ivaylov Zaliv’ \i-'vay-lov 'za-liv\) is the 500 m wide cove indenting for 900 m the east coast of Snow Island in the South Shetland Islands, Antarctica. It is bounded by the small Hall Peninsula on the west and southwest, Ogygia Island on the south and Trapecio Island on the northeast. The area was visited by early 19th century sealers.

The cove is named after Czar Ivaylo of Bulgaria, 1277–1279.

Location
British mapping in 1968, Bulgarian in 2009.

Maps
 L.L. Ivanov. Antarctica: Livingston Island and Greenwich, Robert, Snow and Smith Islands. Scale 1:120000 topographic map.  Troyan: Manfred Wörner Foundation, 2009.  
 Antarctic Digital Database (ADD). Scale 1:250000 topographic map of Antarctica. Scientific Committee on Antarctic Research (SCAR). Since 1993, regularly upgraded and updated.
 L.L. Ivanov. Antarctica: Livingston Island and Smith Island. Scale 1:100000 topographic map. Manfred Wörner Foundation, 2017.

Notes

References
 Ivaylo Cove. SCAR Composite Gazetteer of Antarctica.
 Bulgarian Antarctic Gazetteer. Antarctic Place-names Commission. (details in Bulgarian, basic data in English)

External links
 Ivaylo Cove. Copernix satellite image

Coves of the South Shetland Islands
Bulgaria and the Antarctic